The Debrecin Roller is a breed of fancy pigeon. Debreciner Rollers, along with other varieties of domesticated pigeons, are all descendants from the rock pigeon (Columba livia).

See also 

List of pigeon breeds

Pigeon breeds